"Worst Day" is a song by American rapper Future. It was released through Epic Records and Freebandz as a single on February 11, 2022, and is included on the deluxe edition of his ninth studio album I Never Liked You. Future wrote the song with producers Wheezy, Taurus, Jasper Harris, and Russ Chell. A Valentine's Day song that sees Future rap about his hate for the holiday, it was released three days before it. It also serves as his first solo single in almost two years, following the release of "Tycoon", from his eighth studio album, High Off Life (2020).

Release and promotion
On February 8, 2022, Future shared a clip of the accompanying music video of the song with Kevin Samuels, titled "Healing Together with Dr. Kevin Samuels". The following day, he revealed the cover art of the song.

Composition and lyrics 
The song has been described as "a little smoother and glossier than most Future singles". On the Valentine's Day song, Future raps about the stress that comes with purchasing gifts for a lot of beautiful women: "Valentine's Day, the worst day, got too many to please".

Music video
The official music video for "Worst Day" premiered alongside the song on February 11, 2022. American YouTuber and dating advisor Kevin Samuels plays Future's therapist, describing himself as a "professional image consultant". At the beginning of the video, Future confesses to Samuels about his addiction to buying many women excess gifts for Valentine's Day. He added that he usually spends "around two to three" on presents, with Samuels assuming that the numbers are referring to thousands, but Future corrects him and says that they are referring to millions. The video sees Future doing exactly that as he is seen with a woman, spoiling her with roses, expensive pieces of jewelry, and other lavish items.

Credits and personnel
Credits adapted from Tidal.

 Future – vocals, songwriting
 Wheezy – production, songwriting
 Taurus – production, songwriting
 Jasper Harris – production, songwriting
 Russ Chell – production, songwriting
 Eric Manco – mixing
 Glenn Schick – mastering

Charts

Release history

References

2022 singles
2022 songs
Future (rapper) songs
Songs written by Future (rapper)
Songs written by Wheezy (record producer)
Song recordings produced by Wheezy (record producer)